Armenian–Jewish relations are complex, often due to political and historical reasons.

Comparisons

The Armenians and the Jews have been often compared in both academic and non-academic literature since at least the early 20th century, often in the context of the Armenian genocide and the Holocaust, which along with the Cambodian genocide and the Rwandan genocide are considered among the most notorious genocides of the 20th century. Historians, journalists, political experts have pointed out a number of similarities between the two ethnic groups: the wide dispersion around the world, the relatively small size, the former lack of statehood, the fact that both countries are largely surrounded by Muslim and mainly hostile countries, their influential lobby in the United States, their success in business and as model minorities, and even their success in chess.

Charles William Wilson wrote in the 11th edition of Encyclopædia Britannica (1911):

During her visit to Armenia in 2012, the Israeli Minister of Agriculture Orit Noked stated, "We are like each other with our history, character, with our small number of population and having communities abroad−."

History

The first contacts between the Armenians and the Jews date back to the antiquity. Tigranes the Great, under whom Armenia reached its greatest extent, settled thousands of Jews into Armenia in 1st century BC. Today, there is only a small, mostly Russified Jewish community of 800 in Armenia still remaining.

Armenians have had a presence in Israel for centuries. The Armenian Patriarchate of Jerusalem was founded in 638. It is located in the Armenian Quarter, the smallest of the four quarters of the Old City of Jerusalem. According to a 2006 study, 790 Armenians live in the Old City alone.

One of the earliest mentions of the Armenians and the Jews is in the 1723 book Travels Through Europe, Asia, and Into Parts of Africa by French traveler Aubry de La Motraye, where the author writes that the Armenians and Jews are "reckon'd more honest" compared to the Greeks in the Ottoman Empire.

Israel supported Azerbaijan in the first Nagorno-Karabakh War against Armenia in the early 1990s. According to the Journal of Turkish Weekly, "Turkey's and Israel's good relations with Georgia and Azerbaijan cause conspiracy theories in Yerevan, and the radical Armenians argue that the Jews play the main role in this 'anti-Armenian great strategy'."

In 2004, a private TV company named ALM owned by Tigran Karapetyan has "used the platform to air views that portrayed Jews as an unsavory race bent on dominating Armenia and the wider world." In 2005, Armen Avetisyan, the leader of a small radical nationalist party, Armenian Aryan Union, was arrested on charges of inciting ethnic hatred. The Holocaust memorial in a Yerevan park was vandalized in 2004.

Nourhan Manougian, the Armenian Patriarch of Jerusalem, stated that Armenians are treated as "third-class citizens".

Antisemitism in Armenia

According to the ADL's 2014 survey, around 58 percent of Armenians expressing antisemitic tendencies and prejudices, while 90 percent of Armenians, when asked about The Holocaust, stated that "The Holocaust did actually happen".

The president of the Jewish Community in Armenia, Rima Varzhapetyan-Feller, has stated on January 23, 2015, that "The Jewish community feels itself protected in Armenia, and the authorities respect their rights, culture, and traditions. There is no anti-Semitism in Armenia, and we enjoy good relations with the Armenians. Of course, the community has certain problems that originate from the general situation of the country."

Jewish/Israeli position on the Armenian genocide

Ambassador Morgenthau's Story (1918), one of the major primary sources discussing the Armenian genocide, was written by Henry Morgenthau, Sr., an American Jew. Similarly, The Forty Days of Musa Dagh (1933), one of the best-known novels about the genocide, was written by Franz Werfel, an Austrian Jew. Raphael Lemkin, a Polish Jewish lawyer, coined the concept of genocide as a crime against humanity, basing it on the Armenian experience.

There has been a controversy around the recognition of the Armenian genocide by Israel. It is suggested by Yair Auron that Israel doesn't want to hurt its relations with Turkey and wants to retain the "uniqueness" of the Holocaust.

In 2001, Israeli Foreign Minister Shimon Peres described the Armenian genocide as "meaningless". In response, historian and genocide expert Israel Charny accused Peres of going "beyond a moral boundary that no Jew should allow himself to trespass." In his letter to Peres, Charny stated:

In 2008, Yosef Shagal, former Israeli parliamentarian from right wing Yisrael Beiteinu in an interview to Azerbaijan media stated: "I find it is deeply offensive, and even blasphemous to compare the Holocaust of European Jewry during the Second World War with the mass extermination of the Armenian people during the First World War. Jews were killed because they were Jews, but Armenians provoked Turkey and should blame themselves."

The Knesset failed to vote for the Armenian genocide bill in 2011. Knesset Speaker Reuven Rivlin, among its supporters, stated "It is my duty as a Jew and Israeli to recognize the tragedies of other peoples."

After some previous opposition, Jewish lobby groups in the United States have joined in the call for recognition of the Armenian genocide by the U.S. government.  Grassroots activism by Jewish Americans was influential regarding this issue.  In 2014, the prominent American Jewish Committee paid tribute to the memories of the victims of the genocide of Armenians.  The AJC called on the government of Turkey to not only provide full access to the historical record of that dark period but also to address the realities the records reveal.  In 2015, the Jewish Council for Public Affairs adopted a resolution on Armenian genocide that calls on the U.S. Congress and U.S. president to recognize the Armenian genocide.

Notable people of mixed Armenian-Jewish descent 
Levon Aronian (Jewish father, Armenian mother), Armenian chess grandmaster
Yelena Bonner (Armenian father, Jewish mother), Soviet and Russian human rights activist
Sergei Dovlatov (half-Jewish father, Armenian mother), Soviet journalist and writer
Garry Kasparov (Jewish father, Armenian mother), Soviet and Russian chess grandmaster, considered by many the greatest chess player
Yevgeny Petrosyan (Armenian father, Jewish mother), Russian comedian
Aram Saroyan (Armenian father, Jewish mother), American poet (son of William Saroyan and Carol Grace) 
Richard Shepard (Jewish father, Armenian mother), American film and television director
Jackie Speier (Jewish father, Armenian mother), US Congresswoman from California
Michael Vartan (Armenian, Bulgarian, and Hungarian father, Jewish mother), French-American film and television actor
Zurab Zhvania (Georgian father, mixed Jewish-Armenian mother), Georgian politician
Michael Artin (half-Armenian father and half-Jewish mother), American mathematician
Joe Strummer (Armenian great-grandfather and German-Jewish great-grandmother), British musician
Armen Weitzman (Armenian and European Jewish descent), American actor
Maxine Cassin, American poet
Peter Gabel (half-Armenian mother, Jewish father; son of Arlene Francis and Martin Gabel), law academic, editor of Tikkun magazine

Notable Armenian-Jewish marriages
Dolores Zohrab (Armenian) and Henry L. Liebmann (Jewish)
William Saroyan (Armenian) and Carol Grace (Jewish)
Tigran Petrosian (Armenian) and Rona Yakovlevna Avinezer (Jewish)
Mikhail Botvinnik (Jewish) and Gayane Davidovna Ananova (Armenian)
Levon Ter-Petrosyan (Armenian) and Lyudmila Ter-Petrosyan (Jewish)
Ruben Vardanyan (Armenian) and Veronika Zonabend (Jewish)
Emil Artin (Armenian father) and Natalie "Natascha" Naumovna Jasny (Jewish father)
Garik Martirosyan (Armenian) and Zhanna Levina (Jewish)
Leonid Khachiyan (Armenian) and Olga Pischikova Reynberg (Jewish)
Abram Alikhanov and Slava Solomonovna Roshal (Jewish)

See also 
 Armenia–Israel relations

Works

Books
 Turabian, Aram. La France: les Arméniens et les juifs [English: The Armenians and the Jews]. 1938

Articles
 Sofer, Leo: Armenier und Juden. Zeitschrift für Demographie und Statistik der Juden, Jg 3 (1907) Nr 5, S. 65–69.
 Weissenberg, Samuel. "Armenier und Juden". Sonderabdruck aus dem Archiv für Anthropologie Braunschweig 13, no. 4 (1914), 383–387.
Nadel-Golobič, Eleonora. "Armenians and Jews in Medieval Lvov. Their Role in Oriental Trade 1400–1600", Cahiers du Monde russe et soviétique, Vol. 20, No. 3/4 (Jul. - Dec., 1979), pp. 345–388, École des hautes études en sciences sociales, Paris
Charny, Israel W. "The Turks, Armenians and Jews". The Book of the International Conference on the Holocaust and Genocide: Book One. The Conference Program and Crisis. 1983.
Dekmejian, R. Hrair. "Determinants of genocide: Armenians and Jews as case studies". The Armenian Genocide in Perspective (1986): 92–94.
Dadrian, Vahakn N. "The Convergent Aspects of the Armenian and Jewish Cases of Genocide. A Reinterpretation of the Concept of Holocaust". Holocaust and Genocide Studies 3.2 (1988): 151-169
 Heinsohn, G. "Armenier und Juden als Testfall für die Streichung von drei Jahrhunderten durch Heribert Illig" Ethik und Sozialwissenschaften: Streitforum für Erwägungskultur (EuS) 8.4 (1997): 490.
 Cohen, Raya. "Le génocide arménien dans la mémoire collective juive". Les cahiers du judaïsme 3 (1998): 113–122.
Dadrian, Vahakn N. "The Historical and Legal Interconnections between the Armenian Genocide and the Jewish Holocaust: From Impunity to Retributive Justice". The Yale Journal of International Law 23 (1998): 503

Other

References

Armenian diaspora
Armenian diaspora in Israel
Jewish Armenian history
International relations